A randomness extractor, often simply called an "extractor", is a function, which being applied to output from a weakly random entropy source, together with a short, uniformly random seed, generates a highly random output that appears independent from the source and uniformly distributed.  Examples of weakly random sources include radioactive decay or thermal noise; the only restriction on possible sources is that there is no way they can be fully controlled, calculated or predicted, and that a lower bound on their entropy rate can be established.  For a given source, a randomness extractor can even be considered to be a true random number generator (TRNG); but there is no single extractor that has been proven to produce truly random output from any type of weakly random source.

Sometimes the term "bias" is used to denote a weakly random source's departure from uniformity, and in older literature, some extractors are called unbiasing algorithms, as they take the randomness from a so-called "biased" source and output a distribution that appears unbiased.  The weakly random source will always be longer than the extractor's output, but an efficient extractor is one that lowers this ratio of lengths as much as possible, while simultaneously keeping the seed length low.  Intuitively, this means that as much randomness as possible has been "extracted" from the source.

Note that an extractor has some conceptual similarities with a pseudorandom generator (PRG), but the two concepts are not identical. Both are functions that take as input a small, uniformly random seed and produce a longer output that "looks" uniformly random. Some pseudorandom generators are, in fact, also extractors.  (When a PRG is based on the existence of hard-core predicates, one can think of the weakly random source as a set of truth tables of such predicates and prove that the output is statistically close to uniform.) However, the general PRG definition does not specify that a weakly random source must be used, and while in the case of an extractor, the output should be statistically close to uniform, in a PRG it is only required to be computationally indistinguishable from uniform, a somewhat weaker concept.

NIST Special Publication 800-90B (draft) recommends several extractors, including the SHA hash family and states that if the amount of entropy input is twice the number of bits output from them, that output can be considered essentially fully random.

Formal definition of extractors
In essence, this measures how likely  is to take its most likely value, giving a worst-case bound on how random  appears.

For an n-bit distribution  with min-entropy k, we say that  is an  distribution.

Definition (Extractor):  (k, ε)-extractor

Let 

In the above definition,  ε-close refers to statistical distance.

Intuitively, an extractor takes a weakly random n-bit input and a short, uniformly random seed and produces an m-bit output that looks uniformly random.

Strong extractors
An extractor is strong if concatenating the seed with the extractor's output yields a distribution that is still close to uniform.

Definition (Strong Extractor): A -strong extractor is a function

 

Explicit extractors
Using the probabilistic method, it can be shown that there exists a (k, ε)-extractor, i.e. that the construction is possible. However, it is usually not enough merely to show that an extractor exists.  An explicit construction is needed, which is given as follows:

Definition (Explicit Extractor): For functions k(n), ε(n), d(n), m(n) a family Ext = {Extn} of functions

 

is an explicit (k, ε)-extractor, if Ext(x, y) can be computed in polynomial time (in its input length) and for every n, Extn is a (k(n), ε(n))-extractor.

By the probabilistic method, it can be shown that there exists a (k, ε)-extractor with seed length

 

and output length

 .

Dispersers
A variant of the randomness extractor with weaker properties is the disperser.

Randomness extractors in cryptography
One of the most important aspects of cryptography is random key generation. It is often necessary to generate secret and random keys from sources that are semi-secret or which may be compromised to some degree. By taking a single, short (and secret) random key as a source, an extractor can be used to generate a longer pseudo-random key, which then can be used for public key encryption. More specifically, when a strong extractor is used its output will appear be uniformly random, even to someone who sees part (but not all) of the source.  For example, if the source is known but the seed is not known (or vice versa).  This property of extractors is particularly useful in what is commonly called Exposure-Resilient cryptography in which the desired extractor is used as an Exposure-Resilient Function (ERF).  Exposure-Resilient cryptography takes into account that the fact that it is difficult to keep secret the initial exchange of data which often takes place during the initialization of an encryption application e.g., the sender of encrypted information has to provide the receivers with information which is required for decryption.

The following paragraphs define and establish an important relationship between two kinds of ERF--k-ERF and k-APRF--which are useful in Exposure-Resilient cryptography.  
 
Definition (k-ERF): An adaptive k-ERF is a function  where, for a random input  , when a computationally unbounded adversary  can adaptively read all of  except for   bits,   for some negligible function  (defined below).

The goal is to construct an adaptive ERF whose output is highly random and uniformly distributed. But a stronger condition is often needed in which every output occurs with almost uniform probability. For this purpose Almost-Perfect Resilient Functions (APRF) are used.  The definition of an APRF is as follows:

Definition (k-APRF): A  APRF is a function  where, for any setting of  bits of the input  to any fixed values, the probability vector  of the output   over the random choices for the   remaining bits satisfies  for all  and for some negligible function .

Kamp and Zuckerman have proved a theorem stating that if a function  is a k-APRF, then  is also a k-ERF. More specifically, any extractor having sufficiently small error and taking as input an oblivious, bit-fixing source is also an APRF and therefore also a k-ERF. A more specific extractor is expressed in this lemma:

Lemma: Any -extractor  for the set of  oblivious bit-fixing sources, where  is negligible, is also a k-APRF.

This lemma is proved by Kamp and Zuckerman. The lemma is proved by examining the distance from uniform of the output, which in a -extractor obviously is at most , which satisfies the condition of the APRF.

The lemma leads to the following theorem, stating that there in fact exists a k-APRF function as described:

Definition (negligible function): In the proof of this theorem, we need a definition of a negligible function. A function  is defined as being negligible if   for all constants .

Proof:

 
 

And since  is a positive integer we know that  is at most .

 

and by using the value of  we have:

 

Using this value of  we account for the worst case, where  is on its lower bound. Now by algebraic calculations we get:

 

 

 

Which inserted in the value of  gives

 ,

which proves that there exists an explicit k-APRF extractor with the given properties.

Examples

Von Neumann extractor

Perhaps the earliest example is due to John von Neumann. From the input stream, his extractor took bits, two at a time (first and second, then third and fourth, and so on). If the two bits matched, no output was generated. If the bits differed, the value of the first bit was output. The Von Neumann extractor can be shown to produce a uniform output even if the distribution of input bits is not uniform so long as each bit has the same probability of being one and there is no correlation between successive bits.

Thus, it takes as input a Bernoulli sequence with  not necessarily equal to 1/2, and outputs a Bernoulli sequence with 
More generally, it applies to any exchangeable sequence—it only relies on the fact that for any pair, 01 and 10 are equally likely: for independent trials, these have probabilities , while for an exchangeable sequence the probability may be more complicated, but both are equally likely.

Chaos machine
Another approach is to use the output of a chaos machine applied to the input stream. This approach generally relies on properties of chaotic systems. Input bits are pushed to the machine, evolving orbits and trajectories in multiple dynamical systems. Thus, small differences in the input produce very different outputs. Such a machine has a uniform output even if the distribution of input bits is not uniform or has serious flaws, and can therefore use weak entropy sources. Additionally, this scheme allows for increased complexity, quality, and security of the output stream, controlled by specifying three parameters: time cost, memory required, and secret key.

Cryptographic hash function
It is also possible to use a cryptographic hash function as a randomness extractor. However, not every hashing algorithm is suitable for this purpose.

Applications

Randomness extractors are used widely in cryptographic applications, whereby a cryptographic hash function is applied to a high-entropy, but non-uniform source, such as disk drive timing information or keyboard delays, to yield a uniformly random result.

Randomness extractors have played a part in recent developments in quantum cryptography, where photons are used by the randomness extractor to generate secure random bits.

Randomness extraction is also used in some branches of computational complexity theory.

Random extraction is also used to convert data to a simple random sample, which is normally distributed, and independent, which is desired by statistics.

See also
 Decorrelation
 Hardware random number generator
 Randomness merger
 Fuzzy extractor

References

Randomness Extractors for Independent Sources and Applications, Anup Rao
Recent developments in explicit constructions of extractors, Ronen Shaltiel
Randomness Extraction and Key Derivation Using the CBC, Cascade and HMAC Modes, Yevgeniy Dodis et al.
Key Derivation and Randomness Extraction, Olivier Chevassut et al.
Deterministic Extractors for Bit-Fixing Sources and Exposure-Resilient Cryptography,  Jesse Kamp and David Zuckerman
Tossing a Biased Coin (and the optimality of advanced multi-level strategy) (lecture notes), Michael Mitzenmacher

Computational complexity theory
Cryptographic algorithms
Random number generation